Potsdam University may refer to:
 University of Potsdam, Germany
 State University of New York at Potsdam, USA